Netherwood "Ned" Hughes (12 June 1900 – 4 April 2009) was one of the last two Tommies who served the United Kingdom during the First World War, along with Harry Patch, although Patch was the only one to have seen action. Hughes was also one of three British veterans still living in the country, with Patch and Henry Allingham being the other two. The Ministry of Defence has not confirmed his war service, but many First World War service records were destroyed in the Blitz during the Second World War. However the World War I Veterans Association invited him to the Cenotaph for the 90th Anniversary of the Armistice. He did not attend as his family felt that the journey would be too much for him.

He was born in Great Harwood, the middle child of seven siblings to John, who worked as an optician, and Robina. He had three brothers: Charlie, Henry, and Sidney, who served in the Royal Navy on HMS Albion. Hughes spent most of his working life as a mechanic and driver and, in June 1918, he was called up, like every other driver in Great Britain, to perform that role in the British Army. While he was still in training the war ended, and he returned home to drive in a mill. He later became a bus driver. Hughes married twice, but never had any children, although he was frequently visited by his nephews at his care home, Woodlands Home for the Elderly in Clayton-le-Moors, where he spent most of his time in the grounds, smoking his pipe.

When receiving a birthday card from the Queen each year since his 100th birthday, he commented: "She has the same frock on".

In his final few weeks, Ned's health deteriorated and he had difficulty speaking for a week before his death, according to his niece, Ann Hutton. He died of natural causes on 4 April 2009, aged 108, at Woodlands. Speaking to the Accrington Observer, Mrs Hutton said, "It’s not the family’s wishes for a military funeral. We don’t want bugles and whistles, we just want a simple family affair. He couldn’t stand any fuss on his birthdays."

See also
 List of last surviving World War I veterans

References

1900 births
2009 deaths
British Army personnel of World War I
British centenarians
Men centenarians
People from Great Harwood
Manchester Regiment soldiers
Military personnel from Lancashire